"Light My Fire" is a song by the American rock band the Doors. It was recorded in August 1966 and released in January 1967 on their eponymous debut album. Released as an edited single on April 24, 1967, it spent three weeks at number one on the Billboard Hot 100 chart (in July 29, August 5 and August 12, 1967), and one week on the Cash Box Top 100, nearly a year after its recording. Due to its erotic lyrics and innovative structure, the song has come to be regarded a synonymous with the 60s psychedelic and sexual revolutions.

A year later, it re-entered the Billboard Hot 100 in 1968 following the success of José Feliciano's cover version of the song (which peaked at number three on the Billboard chart), peaking at number 87. The song was principally written by the band's guitarist, Robby Krieger, but was credited to the entire band.

History

"Light My Fire" originated in early 1966 as a composition by Robby Krieger, who said that he was inspired by the melody of "Hey Joe" and the lyrics of the Rolling Stones' "Play with Fire".  On taking his initial composition to the band, John Densmore suggested that it should have more of a Latin rhythm, Jim Morrison wrote the second verse and part of the chorus ("Try to set the night on fire"), while Ray Manzarek added the Bach-influenced introductory organ motif; Densmore also suggested that it should open with a single snare drum hit.

The band started playing the song in performances in April 1966, and extended it with a jazzy improvisation.  When the Doors performed the song at live concerts, Manzarek played the song's bass line with his left hand on a Fender Rhodes Piano Bass, while performing the main keyboard lines on a Vox Continental using his right hand.  When they came to record the song later in the year, producer Paul A. Rothchild brought in session musician Larry Knechtel to overdub a Fender Precision Bass guitar to double the keyboard bass line.  Rothchild also suggested that the recording repeat the introductory motif at the end of the track.

Although the album version was just over seven minutes long, it was widely requested for radio play, notably by Los Angeles DJ Dave Diamond, and Elektra Records owner Jac Holzman asked that a shorter version be released as a single. Despite the band's reluctance, Rothchild edited a single version, cut down to under three minutes with nearly all the instrumental break removed for airplay on AM radio.

The Ed Sullivan Show
The band appeared on various TV shows, such as American Bandstand, miming to a playback of the single. "Light My Fire" was also performed live by the Doors on The Ed Sullivan Show broadcast on September 17, 1967. The Doors were asked by producer Bob Precht, Ed Sullivan's son-in-law, to change the line "girl, we couldn't get much higher", as the sponsors were uncomfortable with the possible reference to drugs. However, the meaning of the line was confirmed to be literal, as in "high in the sky". The band agreed to do so, and did a rehearsal using the amended lyrics, "girl, we couldn't get much better". However, during the live performance, lead singer Jim Morrison sang the original, unaltered lyrics. Sullivan did not shake Morrison's hand as he left the stage. The band had been negotiating a multi-episode deal with the producers; however, after violating the agreement not to perform the offending line, they were informed they would never perform on the show again. Morrison's response was "Hey man. We just did the Sullivan show."

This performance was portrayed in Oliver Stone's 1991 biopic film, but with Morrison singing "higher" more emphatically and without his subsequent retort to Sullivan and the show's producer.

Buick TV commercial
Drummer John Densmore recalled that Buick offered $75,000 in October 1968 to adapt the song for use in a Buick TV commercial ("Come on, Buick, light my fire"). Morrison, however, was still in London after a European tour had just ended on September 20, and could not be contacted by the other band members, who agreed to the deal in his absence. As the band had agreed in 1965 to both equal splits and everyone having veto power in decisions, Morrison consequently called Buick and threatened to personally smash a Buick with a sledgehammer on television, should the commercial be aired.

Musical structure
"Light My Fire" is notated in the key of A Minor. Ray Manzarek's keyboard playing descends from G to D Major, then goes to F and B-flat major; continuing onto the pitches of E-flat and A-flat major, before returning to the initial key of A Major. This alternation was based on Johann Bach's  "Two and Three Part Inventions", but author Philip Clark has suggested that it may have been inspired by Dave Brubeck's compositions. The extended solo arrangement is performed throughout the keys of A Minor and B Minor, the same chord progression used by John Coltrane on his cover version of "My Favorite Things". According to Manzarek, the instrumental sections were an homage to John Coltrane whom the band admired. Parts of the solos also contain polyrhythm vogue.

Speed discrepancy
The 40th Anniversary mix of the debut album presents a stereo version of "Light My Fire" in speed-corrected form for the first time. The speed discrepancy (being about 3.5% slow) was brought to Bruce Botnick's attention by Brigham Young University professor Michael Hicks, who noted that all video and audio live performances of the Doors performing the song, the sheet music, and statements of band members show the song in a key almost a half step higher (key of A) than the stereo LP release (key of A♭/G♯). Until the 2006 remasters, only the original 45 RPM singles ("Light My Fire" and "Break On Through") were produced at the correct speed.

Release and legacy
A live version was released in 1983 on their live album Alive, She Cried, the first of several live albums released in subsequent decades to include the song. "Light My Fire" achieved modest success in Australia, where it peaked at number 22 on the ARIA chart. The single originally reached number 49 in the UK in 1967, but experienced belated success in that country in 1991, when a reissue peaked at number seven. This reissue was more successful in Ireland, peaking atop the IRMA chart for two weeks in June. The reissue occurred due to revived interest in the band following Oliver Stone's film biopic The Doors.

The single was certified gold by the Recording Industry Association of America in September 1967 for exceeding one million units shipped. As of December 1971, it was the band's best-selling single with over 927,000 copies sold.
It was also certified Platinum by the RIAA in September 2018 for reaching 1,000,000 digital units. Billboard described the single as a "top discotheque offering" with an "infectious beat" that "really grooves from start to finish." Cash Box called the single a "potent, pounding foot-stomper with unlimited potential."

"Light My Fire" has been widely considered the Doors' finest song, and a quintessential work of the psychedelic rock genre. In 2004 and 2010, the song was ranked at number 35 on Rolling Stones 500 Greatest Songs of All Time, then it was re-ranked at number 310 on the 2021 list. It was included in RIAA's Songs of the Century list, at number 52. In 2014 NME ranked the song 199th in its 500 Greatest Songs of All Time list. Feliciano's cover won the 1969 Grammy Award for Best Male Pop Vocal Performance, the same year he also won the Grammy for Best New Artist. In 1998, the track was inducted into the Grammy Hall of Fame under the category Rock (single).

PersonnelThe DoorsJohn Densmore – drums
Robby Krieger – electric guitar
Ray Manzarek – Vox Continental organ, Rhodes piano bass
Jim Morrison – vocalsAdditional musicianLarry Knechtel – bass guitar

Charts and certifications

Weekly chartsYear-end chartsCertificationsJosé Feliciano cover

Puerto Rican vocalist and guitarist José Feliciano enjoyed significant international success when he released his version of "Light My Fire" in 1968 as a single on the RCA Victor label. It is perhaps the best known cover of this song, reaching number 3 on the U.S. Billboard Hot 100 charts, only a year after the original had been a number-one hit on the same chart. His version became the bigger hit in Australia and also in Canada, where it reached number one.

Feliciano's remake blended Latin influences, including a mixture of classic Spanish guitar, and soul, with American pop. It contains "proto-Latin rock" stylings, and a slower tempo than the Doors original version. In a 1969 interview, Feliciano said that he liked the song when he first heard it, but felt that he should wait a year before releasing the song.  He also said that "California Dreamin'" was the original A-side of the single.

The single helped to spur the worldwide success of its album, Feliciano!, which was nominated for multiple Grammy Awards in 1969. Feliciano's arrangement of "Light My Fire" has influenced several subsequent versions, including that by Will Young. Songwriter Robby Krieger said in an interview about the cover: "It's really a great feeling to have written a classic. I think I owe a big debt to Jose Feliciano because he is actually the one, when he did it, everybody started doing it. He did a whole different arrangement on it."

Feliciano revisited the song, performing a duet with Minnie Riperton on her 1979 album Minnie.

Chart history

Weekly chartsYear-end chartsAmii Stewart version

In 1979, Amii Stewart released a disco version of "Light My Fire", together with a medley titled "137 Disco Heaven". It was a big hit in the UK, where it reached No. 5, and a mild hit in West Germany, peaking at No. 26. In the U.S., the song peaked at No. 69 on the Billboard Hot 100 and No. 36 on the Billboard Hot Soul Singles chart.

It reached the top 10 in the UK a second time in 1985, in remixed form together with "Knock on Wood/Ash 48". This release peaked at No. 7.

Track listing
 1979 12" "Light My Fire" / "137 Disco Heaven"8:22
 "Bring It on Back to Me"3:58

 1985 UK 12" "Knock on Wood" / "Ash 48"7:45
 "Light My Fire" / "137 Disco Heaven"7:35

Charts
Weekly charts

Year-end charts

Will Young cover

English singer and Pop Idol series 1 winner Will Young covered "Light My Fire" in 2002. He originally performed a piano version of the song in the final 50 of Pop Idol, and again, with a backing track, in the final 10. A studio version, recorded in the style of Puerto Rican musician José Feliciano's version, was later released as his second single. The song went straight to the number one spot in the UK Singles Chart, selling 177,000 copies in its first week of release, while staying at number one for two weeks. Young also performed the song on World Idol, where he came in fifth place.

Track listings

Credits and personnel
Credits are lifted from the From Now On album booklet.Studios Produced at Olympic Studios (London, England)
 Mastered at Metropolis (London, England)Personnel'''

 Jim Morrison – writing
 Ray Manzarek – writing
 John Densmore – writing
 Robby Krieger – writing
 Milton McDonald – guitars
 Karlos Edwards – percussion
 Nick Ingman – string arrangement, conducting
 Gavyn Wright – orchestra leader
 Isobel Griffiths Ltd. – orchestra contracting
 Absolute – all other instruments, production
 Steve Fitzmaurice – mixing
 Philippe Rose – mixing assistant
 Tony Cousins – mastering

Charts

Weekly charts

Year-end charts

Certifications

Release history

References

Further reading
Burns, Gary. "A Typology of 'Hooks' in Popular Records."Popular Music 6.1 (1987): 1-20. Web.

External links
 Ray Manzarek of The Doors, an interview on Fresh Air Light My Fire from All Things Considered'', 2000 interviews about the song with the surviving members of the Doors
 
 

1966 songs
1967 singles
1968 singles
1979 singles
1999 singles
2002 singles
Billboard Hot 100 number-one singles
Cashbox number-one singles
The Doors songs
Amii Stewart songs
José Feliciano songs
Songs written by John Densmore
Songs written by Robby Krieger
Songs written by Ray Manzarek
Songs written by Jim Morrison
Irish Singles Chart number-one singles
RPM Top Singles number-one singles
Number-one singles in Scotland
UK Singles Chart number-one singles
Will Young songs
Grammy Hall of Fame Award recipients
Grammy Award for Best Male Pop Vocal Performance
Song recordings produced by Paul A. Rothchild
Elektra Records singles
RCA Victor singles
Blue Note Records singles
EMI Records singles
19 Recordings singles
Syco Music singles
Bertelsmann Music Group singles
Hansa Records singles
Atlantic Records singles
Ariola Records singles
Obscenity controversies in music